Gary Barwin (born 1964 in Belfast, Northern Ireland) is a Canadian poet, writer, composer, multimedia artist, performer and educator who lives in Hamilton, Ontario, Canada. He writes in a range of genres including poetry, fiction, visual poetry, music for live performers and computers, text and sound works, and writing for children and young adults. His music and writing have been presented in Canada, the US, Japan, and Europe.

Barwin was born in Belfast, Northern Ireland, and emigrated to Ottawa, Ontario, in the early 1970s. He graduated from York University with a BFA in music and a BA in creative writing in 1985, where he studied writing with bpNichol, Frank Davey and music with David Mott, James Tenney, and Trichy Sankaran. Barwin received a PhD in music composition from SUNY at Buffalo in 1995. Barwin taught music at Hillfield Strathallan College from 2001 to 2010. He also has taught creative writing at King's University College (Western University),  in the Certificate in Writing Program at McMaster University, and at Mohawk College, and at the Art Forms (Urban Arts Initiative) for street-involved youth. In addition to books, he is the author of chapbooks and pamphlets, many from his own serif of nottingham editions. His work has appeared in anthologies. He was the Fall 2013 eWriter in Residence at the Toronto Public Library, the 2014–2015 Writer-in-Residence at Western University and the London Public Library, and the writer-in-residence at Hillfield Strathallan College in 2016–2017, the 2017–2018 Writer-in-Residence at McMaster University and the Hamilton Public Library, and was 2019 Edna Staebler Writer-in-Residence at Wilfrid Laurier University.

He lives in Hamilton, Ontario, with his wife and three children, where he directs the Niagara Regional Rhyme Gland Laboratory for the National Rhyme Institute.

Awards
Barwin was the winner of the 2013 City of Hamilton Arts Award (Writing), the Hamilton Poetry Book of the Year for 2001 and 2011, and co-winner of 2011 Harbourfront Poetry NOW competition. He has received major grants from the Canada Council and the Ontario Arts Council. He was the recipient of the 1998 Artist Award from the KM Hunter Foundation. Seeing Stars, a YA novel, was a 2001 finalist for the CLA YA book of the year, and was nominated for an Arthur Ellis Award. In 2009, Barwin won a bpNichol Chapbook Award for his book Inverting the Deer.

Barwin's novel Yiddish for Pirates won the 2017 Stephen Leacock Medal for Humour, the Canadian Jewish Literary Award (Fiction), and was shortlisted for the Scotiabank Giller Prize and the Governor General's Award for English-language fiction.

Books
1995: Cruelty to Fabulous Animals, poetry/fiction. Moonstone Press 
1995: The Mud Game, novel, collaboration with Stuart Ross. Mercury Press
1998: Big Red Baby, short fiction. The Mercury Press
1998: Outside the Hat, poetry. Coach House Books
2001: Raising Eyebrows, poetry. Coach House Books
2004: Doctor Weep and Other Strange Teeth, fiction. The Mercury Press
2005: Frogments from the Frag Pool, poetry, collaboration with Derek Beaulieu). Mercury Press
2010: The Porcupinity of the Stars, poetry. Coach House Books.
2011: The Obvious Flap, poetry, collaboration with Gregory Betts, BookThug
2011: Franzlations: the Imaginary Kafka Parables, (poetry, collaboration with Craig Conley and Hugh Thomas). New Star.
2014: Moon Baboon Canoe, poetry. Mansfield Press.
2015: The Wild and Unfathomable Always, visual poetry. Xexoxial Editions*
2015: I, Dr. Greenblatt, Orthodontist, 251-1457, fiction. Anvil Press
2015: Sonosyntactics:  Selected and New Poetry of Paul Dutton,, poetry. Edited and introduced by Barwin. Wilfrid Laurier University Press.
2016: Yiddish for Pirates, novel. Random House Canada
2017: No TV for Woodpeckers, poetry. Buckrider Books, Wolsak and Wynn Press.
2019: A Cemetery for Holes, poetry with Tom Prime. Gordon Hill Press.
2019: For It Is a Pleasure and a Surprise to Breathe: New and Selected Poems. Alessandro Porco, ed., Wolsak and Wynn Press. 
2021: Nothing the Same, Everything Haunted: The Ballad of Motl the Cowboy. Random House Canada.

For Children 
1998: The Racing Worm Brothers, children's fiction. Annick Press
1999: The Magic Mustache, children's fiction. Annick Press
2000: Grandpa's Snowman, children's fiction. Annick Press
2001: Seeing Stars, young adult novel. Stoddart Press
2002: La Moustache Magique, French translation of The Magic Mustache, fiction.

Recordings
These Are The Clams I'm Breathing, (audiocassette), sound poetry, collaboration with Stuart Ross
1992: Recurring Irritations: Document One (Taproot 33) Burning Press
1994: Martin's Idea, spoken word / music, work for reciter, Musicworks CD #60

See also

Canadian literature
Canadian poetry
List of Canadian poets
List of Canadian writers

References

External links 
 Gary Barwin's website

Living people
20th-century Canadian poets
20th-century Canadian male writers
Canadian male poets
Canadian male novelists
University at Buffalo alumni
1964 births
Writers from Belfast
Writers from Hamilton, Ontario
20th-century Canadian novelists
21st-century Canadian novelists
21st-century Canadian poets
York University alumni
Academic staff of McMaster University
Jewish Canadian writers
Stephen Leacock Award winners
21st-century Canadian male writers
Visual poets